Ardea may refer to:
Ardea, Lazio, a town in Lazio, Italy
Ardea (bird), a genus of large herons and some egrets
Ardea (journal), an ornithological journal published by the Netherlands Ornithologists' Union
The Ardea, a condominium high-rise building in Portland, Oregon, USA
Lancia Ardea, a small car produced by the Turin firm between 1939 and 1953
Aridaia, a small town in Pella, Macedonia, Greece